Mark Bowen is an American science writer.

He has written on the politicization of climate change and James Hansen. A biography of climate scientist Lonnie Thompson. The story of the Antarctic Muon And Neutrino Detector Array (AMANDA) and the IceCube Neutrino Observatory project in which Bowen was embedded.

He received a Ph.D. in physics from M.I.T. He is a rock-climber, and a mountain-climber who summited on Mount Kilimanjaro.

Bibliography 
 Thin Ice: Unlocking the Secrets of Climate in the World's Highest Mountains, 2005 
 Censoring Science: Inside the Political Attack on Dr. James Hansen and the Truth of Global Warming, 2007  
 The Telescope in the Ice: Inventing a New Astronomy at the South Pole, 2017

External links 
Author's website 

Review of Censoring Science

References

American science writers
Living people
Year of birth missing (living people)